The Planning Authority (PA) is a government agency which is responsible for land use and planning in Malta.

It was established on 4 April 2016 from the demerger of the Malta Environment and Planning Authority, which also resulted in the creation of the Environment and Resources Authority.

Structure
The Planning Authority consists of a number of boards and committees:
Executive Council
Planning Board
Planning Commission
Agricultural Advisory Committee
Design Advisory Committee
Development Planning Fund

Criticism 
The Planning Authority is often criticized by locals and NGOs for approving permits for apartment flats that are deemed uncharacteristic for Malta's traditional landscape, with the flats considered overly large and made from non-limestone materials. It is also criticized for removing old villas and other buildings, despite the local populace often protesting against this.

References

Government agencies of Malta
Urban planning
2016 establishments in Malta